Albert Herger (27 November 1942 – 27 December 2009) was a Swiss racing cyclist. He rode in the 1968 Tour de France.

References

1942 births
2009 deaths
Swiss male cyclists
Place of birth missing